Chintamani Govind Pendse (28 August 1906 - 1991), also known as Mama Pendse, was a well known Marathi film and stage actor and singer.

He was awarded Sangeet Natak Akademi Award in 1981, given by  the Sangeet Natak Akademi, India's National Academy of Music, Dance & Drama.

References 

1906 births
1991 deaths
Male actors from Maharashtra
Indian male stage actors
Male actors in Marathi cinema
Male actors in Marathi theatre
Marathi actors
Recipients of the Sangeet Natak Akademi Award
20th-century Indian male actors